Karikaanamma or Shri Karikaan Parameshwari  is a Hindu goddess temple in the Western Ghats in Karnataka, India, located near the town of Honnavar, established by Shreedhar Swami. Garbhagudi is carved out of a single rock. In 1970s when Indira Gandhi visited the temple, roads were fully built up to uphill. It is located in the very dense forest, so it is favorite spot for nature lovers. There are views of the Arabian sea from the top of the mountain. It is dedicated to the deity Kali (Devanāgarī: काली).
 Ondadke or Vandadake Shambhulingehwara temple is also nearby to this place.

References

External links
694 temples come under new Endowment Act
Photo of the temple

Hindu temples in Uttara Kannada district